{{Infobox radio station
| name             = WHVE
| logo             = WHVE logo.jpg
| city             = Russell Springs, Kentucky
| area             = Jamestown/Russell SpringsLake Cumberland areaSomerset, KentuckyColumbia, Kentucky
| branding         = 92.7 the Wave
| frequency        = 92.7 MHz
| repeater         =
| airdate          =  (as WTCO-FM)<ref name=bc08>"Directory of Radio Stations in the United States and Canada". ''Broadcasting & Cable Yearbook 2008. Washington, DC: Broadcasting Publications, Inc. 2008. p. D-242. </ref>
| format           = Classic hits
| erp              = 6,000 watts
| haat             = 100 meters
| class            = A
| facility_id      = 26639
| coordinates      = 
| callsign_meaning = 
| former_callsigns = WQEG (1991-1992, CP)WTCO-FM (1992-1995)
| affiliations     = Kentucky News Network
| owner            = Shoreline Communications, Inc.
| licensee         = 
| sister_stations  = 
| webcast          = listen live
| website          = ridingthewave.com 
}}WHVE (92.7 FM, "92.7 The Wave") is a radio station  broadcasting a classic hits format. Licensed to Russell Springs, Kentucky, United States, the station is currently owned by Shoreline Communications, Inc.

History
The station's construction permit was granted by the FCC on November 22, 1991, under the callsign of WQEG. The station's callsign was changed to WTCO-FM''' on November 13, 1992, two months after it was acquired by Heartland Communications on September 4.

The station finally took to the air sometime in 1993. The station's callsign was changed once more, to its current WHVE on July 1, 1995, just after it was acquired by its current owner, Shoreline Communications.

It first broadcast a hot country format upon signing on. The station switched to an Adult contemporary format sometime in 1998–99, and was later switched to Classic Hits.

References

External links

Hve
Classic hits radio stations in the United States
Radio stations established in 1993
Russell County, Kentucky